This is an inclusive list of science fiction television programs whose names begin with the letter E.

E
Live-action
Earth 2 (1994–1995)
Earth 2100 (2009, special, docufiction)
Earth: Final Conflict (1997–2002)
Earth Star Voyager (1988, pilot, film)
Earth vs. the Spider (2001, film)
Edge of Darkness (1985, UK)
Eerie, Indiana (franchise):
Eerie, Indiana (1991–1992)
Eerie, Indiana: The Other Dimension (1998)
Eleventh Hour (franchise):
Eleventh Hour (2006, UK)
Eleventh Hour (2008–2009)
Emerald Soup (1963, UK)
Encrypt (2003, film)
Eon Kid aka Iron Kid (2006–2008, South Korea/Spain, animated)
Escape from Jupiter (1994, Australia)
Éternelle (2009, France, miniseries)
Eureka (2006–2012)
Event, The (2010–2011)
Exo-Man (1977) IMDb
Expanse, The (2015–2022)
Extant (2014–2015)
Extinct (2017)

Animated
Element Hunters (2009–2010, Japan, animated)
Ergo Proxy (2006, Japan, animated)
Eureka Seven (2005–2006, Japan, animated)
Evil Con Carne (2003–2004, animated)
Excel Saga (1999–2000, Japan, animated)
Exosquad (1993–1994, animated)
Extreme Dinosaurs (1997, animated)

References

Television programs, E